Decimus Junius Silanus may refer to:

 Decimus Junius Silanus (translator of Mago), who lived in the 2nd century BC, and was an expert in Punic language and literature
 Decimus Junius Silanus (consul), became consul of the Roman Republic in 62 BC
 Decimus Junius Silanus, Roman senator exiled by the emperor Augustus
 Decimus Junius Silanus Torquatus (died 64), Consul of the Roman Republic in 53

See also
Junia gens